Fenway Sports Group Holdings, LLC (FSG), is an American multinational sports holding conglomerate who own Major League Baseball's Boston Red Sox, the Premier League’s Liverpool F.C., and the National Hockey League's Pittsburgh Penguins. 

FSG was founded in 2001 as New England Sports Ventures (NESV) when John W. Henry joined forces with Tom Werner, Les Otten, The New York Times Company, and other investors to successfully bid for the Red Sox. NESV formally announced its name change to Fenway Sports Group in March 2011.

FSG has been praised for its successful emergence as a sophisticated international sports conglomerate. There has also been criticism. In 2019, it was criticized for an attempt by Liverpool F.C. to trademark  Liverpool, which was turned down because of the "geographical significance" of the name. In 2021, FSG was embroiled in a controversy over its attempts, together with the ownership groups of 11 other football clubs, to create a European Super League. In doing so, FSG sought to emulate elements of the  North American sports model, creating a competition with strictly limited entry beyond a proposed 15 founding member clubs and appearing to largely eliminate the European system of meritocratic promotion and relegation. Principal owner John W. Henry later issued an apology in which he took sole responsibility for the club's involvement in the venture, which subsequently collapsed.

History
New England Sports Ventures, LLC, was formed in accordance with Delaware State Law in 2001. The company registered to do business in Massachusetts in the same year.

Business interests

Boston Red Sox 
The Boston Red Sox are a professional baseball team based in Boston, Massachusetts, and a member of the Major League Baseball’s American League Eastern Division.

In , the Red Sox were sold by the Yawkey Trust to Fenway Sports Group. Red Sox history has also been marked by the team's intense rivalry with the New York Yankees, arguably the fiercest and most historic in North American professional sports. Since , the Red Sox have been perennial playoff contenders and have won four World Series, emerging as one of the most successful major league baseball teams of the decade.

Fenway Park 
Fenway Park is a baseball park near Kenmore Square in Boston, Massachusetts. Located at 4 Jersey Street, it has served as the home ballpark of the Boston Red Sox baseball club since it opened in 1912, and is the oldest Major League Baseball stadium currently in use. It is, along with Chicago's Wrigley Field, one of the pair of the original "jewel box" standard ballparks that are still in use. Considered to be one of the best-known sports venues in the U.S., Fenway Park became the oldest venue used by a professional sports team in the United States in 1999 when the Detroit Tigers moved out of Tiger Stadium which opened the same day as Fenway Park.

Fenway South 
Fenway South is the spring training base of the Boston Red Sox in Fort Myers, Florida. The purpose-built training and player development complex is used year-round by the Red Sox and its minor league farm teams—Worcester Red Sox, Portland Sea Dogs, Greenville Drive, and Salem Red Sox—and includes an 11,000-seat stadium and an additional six baseball fields together with training and medical facilities. As the spring training home of Red Sox, it replaced nearby City of Palms Park. The stadium within Fenway South is called JetBlue Park, through sponsorship by JetBlue Airways, which has maintained major operations at Boston's Logan International Airport since 2004.

Liverpool F.C. 
Having previously partnered with the English football club Fulham F.C., on October 6, 2010, FSG agreed to buy  Liverpool F.C. from owners George N. Gillett, Jr. and Tom Hicks, after the board voted 3–2 to oust them from the club. It purchased through subsidiary, "N.E.S.V. I, LLC" (incorporated in Delaware) and UK based holding company "UKSV Holdings Company Limited." Liverpool won the 2018–19 UEFA Champions League, having finished runners-up in the previous year's competition. They won the 2019–20 Premier League season.

In 2019, FSG was criticized for a failed attempt by Liverpool F.C to trademark the name Liverpool. The supporters' group Spirit of Shankly (SOS) campaigned against the move. When the Intellectual Property Office refused the application because of the "geographical significance" of the name, a spokesman for SOS underlined that the name "belongs to the city of Liverpool and its people."   

In 2021, FSG was embroiled in a controversy over its attempts, along with the owners of a few other football clubs, to create a European Super League. In doing so, FSG wanted to copy the NFL franchise model, creating a league without relegation and promotion, and ending the existing league pyramid system. Whilst widely reported, the suggestion of removing the involved clubs from domestic competition and its associated pyramid were false. The proposed league would take the place of UEFA competitions in the footballing calendar following a similar format of midweek fixtures followed by knockout rounds, albeit with a selective membership.  The league ultimately collapsed following public outcry and criticism from media outlets,  with senior figures from clubs including John Henry making public apologies to fans.

In late 2022, FSG expressed its eagerness to consider new shareholders following the reports that the club was up for sale.

Anfield 
Anfield is a football stadium in the city of Liverpool, England. Built in 1884 and originally the home of Everton F.C., the stadium has been home to Liverpool F.C. since it was formed in 1892. FSG purchased Anfield along with Liverpool F.C. in October 2010.

Pittsburgh Penguins 
On November 29, 2021, FSG announced its intent to purchase a controlling stake in the Pittsburgh Penguins of the National Hockey League. On December 31, 2021, they officially took over as majority owners of the Penguins, and on April 13, 2022, it was announced that the Penguins would play the Boston Bruins in the NHL Winter Classic at Fenway Park on January 2, 2023.

Roush Fenway Keselowski Racing 
Roush Fenway Keselowski Racing (formerly Roush Racing and Roush Fenway Racing) is a racing team competing in NASCAR racing. As one of NASCAR's largest premier racing teams, Roush runs the No. 6 and No. 17 Ford Mustangs in the NASCAR Cup Series and previously competed in the Xfinity Series (1992–2018), NASCAR Camping World Truck Series (1996–2009) and ARCA RE/MAX Series.

Roush first entered NASCAR competition in 1988, but had competed and won championships in various drag racing and sports car racing series since the mid-1960s. The racing business was originally a small branch of co-owner Jack Roush's successful automotive engineering and road-racing equipment business based in Livonia, Michigan.

On February 14, 2007, FSG purchased 50% of Roush Racing to create a new corporate entity, Roush Fenway Racing.

Salem Red Sox 
In December 2007, Fenway Sports Group agreed to purchase the Salem Avalanche of the Carolina League, Single A Advanced affiliate of the Houston Astros with the anticipation of converting the team to a Boston-affiliated club. In 2009, the Salem, Virginia-based team adopted the Red Sox moniker, including a logo and color scheme to match their parent club.  Since Fenway acquired the club, it has had a relative amount of success, claiming one league title, two division titles, and making three playoff appearances.

Fenway Sports Management 
Fenway Sports Management (FSM) was established by FSG in 2004. It styles itself as a "new kind of sports marketing agency", created by FSG to expand its footprint beyond its most famous holdings, the Boston Red Sox of Major League Baseball and Fenway Park. FSM entered into an exclusive sponsorship sales agreement with MLB Advanced Media and Boston College's major intercollegiate sports in 2004 and as of 2014 counts the Red Sox, Liverpool F.C., LeBron James, Johnny Manziel, BC, Roush Fenway Racing, MLB.com, the PGA Tour's Deutsche Bank Championship, NESN, the Worcester Red Sox and the Salem Red Sox among its client base.

NESN 
The New England Sports Network (NESN) is a regional cable television network that covers the six New England states except Fairfield County, Connecticut and Southbury, Connecticut, a town in New Haven County that is covered by New York City sports networks. FSG is NESN's majority owner (80%) and the Boston Bruins own the remaining 20%. Although it mainly broadcasts non-national Boston Red Sox and Boston Bruins games, NESN also features minor league baseball, regional college sports including college hockey games on Friday nights, various outdoor shows, and sports talk shows featuring the sports columnists of The Boston Globe, as that paper is also owned by John Henry.

Partners

John W. Henry is the principal owner, holding an estimated 40 percent of stock in FSG. Chairman Tom Werner controls the second-largest block of shares. The Boston Globe (owned by Henry) reported in March 2021 that RedBird Capital Partners, a New York private investment firm, had acquired a $750 million stake in Fenway Sports Group to become its third-largest partner, with Boston-based asset manager Michael S. Gordon, president of FSG, holding the fourth-largest share. On 31 March 2021, FSG officially announced that NBA superstar LeBron James and his longtime business partners, Maverick Carter and Paul Wachter – along with Boston Red Sox CEO Sam Kennedy – had also acquired partnerships in FSG.

Partners in Fenway Sports Group LLC as of 5 April 2022 include:
 
Theodore Alfond
William Alfond
Arctos Sports Partners
Maverick Carter
Thomas R. DiBenedetto
Michael J. Egan (Director, Liverpool FC)
Patrick Egan
Chris Fillo
David Ginsberg (Vice chairman)
Michael S. Gordon (President, FSG; director, Liverpool FC)
John W. Henry (Principal owner)
Linda P. Henry
Jimmy Iovine
Mitchell Jacobson
LeBron James
Gary Kaneb
Sam Kennedy (President/CEO, Boston Red Sox)
Seth Klarman
Larry Lucchino (President/CEO emeritus, Boston Red Sox)
Henry F. McCance
Phillip H. Morse (Vice chairman)
Michael Pucker
Bruce Rauner
RedBird Capital Partners
Frank M. Resnek
Laura Trust
Paul Wachter
Herbert Wagner
Richard Warke
Teddy Werner
Thomas C. Werner (Chairman)

Ed Weiss is listed as executive vice president/corporate strategy and general counsel and Greg Morris as chief financial officer.

References

 Boston Red Sox 2010 Media Guide, page 9

External links
 Official website
Boston Red Sox website
 Liverpool F.C. website
 Pittsburgh Penguins website
 RFK Racing website
 NESN website

 
Companies established in 2001
2001 establishments in Delaware
Companies based in Boston
Financial services companies established in 2001
Private equity firms of the United States
Sports holding companies of the United States